, officially Akita Prefectural Oga Aquarium,  is an aquarium located along Oga Peninsula coast, Oga, Akita Prefecture, Japan. GAO stands for Globe, Aqua and Ocean, and sounds like an Oga-native Namahage shout.

Overview 
Overlooking the Sea of Japan, it keeps and displays over 10,000 marine organisms, including those from Akita Prefecture's abundant marine resources and over 400 species of rare aquatic animals from around the world. This is the only tank in Japan where they have Japanese sandfish on display all year round. They also have a touch pool section where you can handle different sea creatures, such as sea urchin and sea cucumbers. During the New Year’s season, divers dress up as Namahage and feed the fishes in the main tank. The aquarium has appeared in the film "Tsuribaka Nisshi 15".

History 
The former Akita Prefectural Aquarium was founded in 1967, and displayed 300 species including Japanese sandfish, Otters, Penguins and White caimans.

Exhibits 

Live sharksucker
Red seabream
Takifugu xanthopterus
Japanese red seaperch
Pitted stingray
Green sea turtle
Japanese poacher
Stereolepis
Omobranchus elegans
Japanese spider crab
Sea raven
Japanese tree frog
Pond loach
Acheilognathus tabira tohokuensis
Pungitius
Japanese fluvial sculpin
Common carp
Montane brown frog
Southern fiddler ray
Melbourne skate
Nezumi fugu
Spotted garden eel
Green chromis
Xingu River ray
Piranha
Southern rockhopper penguin
Northern sea nettle
Earless seals
Sea lions
Jellyfish
Japanese sandfish

{| class="wikitable"
|-
| Source:
|}

Gallery

Parking lot 

It can hold 630 cars and vehicles.

See also 
Oga Quasi-National Park
Nyūdōzaki Lighthouse

Notes

External links 

 
Namahage Shuttle

Aquaria in Japan
Oga, Akita
Tourist attractions in Akita Prefecture
Buildings and structures in Akita Prefecture
Museums in Akita Prefecture